Mudenahalli comes under Mudenahalli Panchayath. It is located 29 KM towards South from District headquarters Ramanagara. 39 KM from State capital Bangalore. Mudenahalli Pin code is 562112 and postal head office is Harohalli. Mudenahalli is surrounded by Ramanagara Taluk towards North , Thally Taluk towards East , Channapatna Taluk towards west , Maddur Taluk towards west. Ramanagaram, Maddur, Malavalli. Bangalore is the nearby Cities to Mudenahalli. 

Kannada is the Local Language here. Total population of Mudenahalli is 1183 .Males are 604 and Females are 579 living in 231 Houses. Total area of Mudenahalli is 380 hectares

Transportation 
Public transport is there from Bangalore BMTC and KR Market. There is no railway link to the village
Muddenahalli is around 55 km from Bangalore via Yelahanka and Devanahalli. Public transport is available up to Harohalli. Mudenahalli village is 1.5 km from this alighting point.

Tourism
There is a meditation centre  Pyramid Valley, which is 3 Km away from the village.

Villages in Ramanagara district